Valley View High School is a public high school in Germantown, Ohio.  It is the only high school in the Valley View Local School District.  Its athletic teams are called The Spartans. The first class to graduate after the consolidation was the class of 1969. The new high school was completed some time after that initial graduation. In 1999, the site was expanded, adding a new music wing, and more cafeteria space. A new k-12 school is under construction near the current high school and is slated for occupancy Fall, 2024.

Ohio High School Athletic Association State Football Tournament History

 Boys Football State Champions – 1994, 1996, 1997 
 State Semifinalists: (7) 1992, 1993, 1994, 1996, 1997, 2000, 2002
 State Playoffs: (19) 1992, 1993, 1994, 1995, 1996, 1997, 1998, 1999, 2000, 2001, 2002, 2003, 2005, 2007, 2008, 2009, 2013, 2016, 2017, 2020

Nickname: Spartans

Colors: Navy Blue and White

Conference: Southwestern Buckeye League (SWBL)

Division: Southwestern

Superintendent: Joe Scholler (2022-present)

Principal: Patrick McKee (2021-present)

Athletic Director: Michael Rasey (2022-present)

Head Coach:  Matt King (2022-present) 

Former Head Coach: Ken Moyer (2021-2022)

Years at School: King-7

Record at School: 228-62-1

Career Record: 239-81-1

Football accomplishments 

SWBL Champs: 1982, 1983

SWBL Champs, Div. III Regional Champs, State Semi-Finalist: 1992, 1993

SWBL Champs, Div. IV Regional Champs, Div. IV State Champs 1994, 1996, 1997

SWBL Champs, Div. IV Regional Runner-up: 1995

SWBL champs, Div. IV Regional Runner-up: 1998

Div. IV Regional Runner-up: 1999, 2001

SWBL Champs, Div. IV Regional Champs, State Semifinalist: 2000

SWBL Champs, Div. III Regional Champs, Div. III State Semifinalist: 2002

SWBL Champs, Div. III Regional Runner up: 2003

SWBL Champs, Div. IV Regional Runner up: 2005

National Sportsmanship Award Winner: 2008

Notable alumni
 Brock Bolen, class of 2004; former American football fullback for the University of Louisville and the NFL's Jacksonville Jaguars and Cleveland Browns
 Shane Hannah, class of 1990; former American football offensive guard for Michigan State University and the NFL's Dallas Cowboys
 Thomas Howard, former MLB player (San Diego Padres, Cleveland Indians, Cincinnati Reds, Houston Astros, Los Angeles Dodgers, St. Louis Cardinals)
 David Riley, former Ball State University and Arena Football League quarterback
 Chris Roetter, Lead vocals singer for Like Moths to Flames. Former singer for Emarosa & Agraceful
Tim Johnson, Class of 1985, Former Graduate Assistant Football Coach for the University of Alabama Crimson Tide (1989, 1990), 2-Time Academic All American Track & Field at University of Findlay (1988, 1989), All American Track & Field University of Findlay 1989

References

External links
 District Website

High schools in Montgomery County, Ohio
Public high schools in Ohio